Harry L. Lewis (April 1, 1920June 9, 2013) was a supporting actor in films and was the founder, along with his wife Marilyn, of the Hamburger Hamlet restaurant chain.

Biography
Lewis was born in Los Angeles, California, on April 1, 1920. His first film role was as a flagman in Dive Bomber (1941). He was immediately put under contract to Warner Bros., at which he made several films. He is perhaps best remembered for his role as Edward "Toots" Bass, one of Edward G. Robinson's henchmen, in 1948's Key Largo.

Other small film roles included appearances as Claude Rains's butler in The Unsuspected (1947),  Sheriff Clyde Boston in Gun Crazy (1949), the head of a gang of criminals in Blonde Dynamite (1950), and as a gangster in "The Monkey Mystery" episode of Adventures of Superman on television (1951). He also had a minor role as a slave in Cecil B. Demille's epic The Ten Commandments.

In 1950, Lewis and his then girlfriend Marilyn Friedman, invested $3,500 to open the Hamburger Hamlet restaurant at the corner of Sunset Boulevard and Hilldale Avenue on the Sunset Strip in Los Angeles. The restaurant was successful and grew into a chain of 24 locations. The couple's two children, David and Adam, joined them in the restaurant business. The Lewises took Hamburger Hamlet public in 1969, and sold the company for $29.2 million in 1987. After the sale, the couple opened new independent restaurants in the Los Angeles area. The reason they gave for the name "Hamburger Hamlet" was because they meant for the eatery to be a restaurant where actors could hang out, and that it was every actor's dream to play Hamlet.

In the late 1960s, Marilyn Lewis launched a ready-to-wear line of clothing under the brand name Cardinali, which was sold at prestigious stores including Saks Fifth Avenue and Bergdorf Goodman and Bullock's Wilshire. The clothing line lasted just nine years, but was influential in its time (featured in Vogue magazine), and was a favorite of Nancy Reagan, Dyan Cannon and Marlo Thomas. The Cardinali line was credited for influencing designers such as Marc Jacobs and various gowns worn to the Oscars.

Lewis died on June 9, 2013 at the age of 93. His widow Marilyn died on May 3, 2017.

Filmography

References

External links
 

1920 births
2013 deaths
20th-century American male actors
Male actors from Los Angeles
People from Beverly Hills, California
American male film actors
American restaurateurs
American male television actors
Businesspeople from Los Angeles
20th-century American businesspeople

it:Harry Lewis (pugile)